Basketball at the 2014 Summer Youth Olympics took place at the Wutaishan Sports Center in Nanjing, China.

Participating teams

Preliminary round

Group A

Group B

Knockout round

Round of 16

Quarterfinals

Semifinals

Bronze-medal game

Final

Final standings

References
Results Book

 

Basketball at the 2014 Summer Youth Olympics